Major-General Ewing Henry Wrigley Grimshaw  (30 June 1911 – 1 November 2007) was a senior British Indian Army and British Army officer who fought in World War II and the Cold War.

Early life
Grimshaw was born in India, the son of an army officer. He was educated at Brighton College before attending the Royal Military College, Sandhurst.

Military career
On 29 January 1931 he commissioned into the 1st Punjab Regiment, garrisoned in India. He first saw active service in the Waziristan campaign (1936–39) and against terrorists in Bengal. In 1939 Grimshaw was serving with the 1st Battalion, 1st Punjab Regiment, and was posted with it to Iraq and Libya. He fought in the Western Desert campaign, during which he was mentioned in dispatches, before his unit was transferred to Burma in early 1943.

By April 1944 Grimshaw was commanding officer of the 1st Battalion of the 1st Punjab Regiment. On 18 April 1944 he was one of the first soldiers to enter Kohima Garrison breaking the siege during the Battle of Kohima. He was mentioned in dispatches for a second time during the Burma campaign. In March 1945 he was promoted to brigadier and took command of the 161st Indian Infantry Brigade, holding the position for a year. In June 1945 he was awarded the Distinguished Service Order for services in Burma.

In October 1947 Grimshaw transferred to the Royal Inniskilling Fusiliers, and in 1948 he served with the regiment during the early stages of the Malayan Emergency. In 1952 he commanded the 1st Battalion of the regiment in the Canal Zone before leading the battalion during operations in the Mau Mau uprising in Kenya. At the conclusion of this tour, his battalion was awarded the Freedom of Nairobi, and as Commanding Officer he was made an Officer of the Order of the British Empire.

Grimshaw's next posting was to HQ Northern Ireland as Chief of Staff, but this posting was shortened by his appointment to command 19 Infantry Brigade at four days notice. Grimshaw was deployed with the brigade to Egypt during the Suez Crisis of 1956, and he was the last British soldier to leave Port Said, having handed over to the United Nations Force Commander. In 1957 he was advanced to CBE. Grimshaw commanded the brigade in Cyprus in operations against EOKA in 1958. This was followed by a staff appointment in the War Office, after which he was promoted to major general. His final commanded was of the 44th (Home Counties) Division in 1962, which carried with it the appointment of Deputy Constable of Dover Castle. He was appointed a Companion of the Order of the Bath in 1965, when he retired.

Appointed on 1 September, between 1966 and 1968 he was Colonel of the Royal Inniskilling Fusiliers.

Personal life
In 1943 he married Hilda Allison, who died in 1993. They had two sons and a daughter; his elder son, Colonel Ewing Grimshaw, died in 1996.

References

Bibliography

External links
Generals of World War II
Indian Army Officers 1939−1945

1911 births
2007 deaths
Military personnel of British India
British Army major generals
British Indian Army officers
Commanders of the Order of the British Empire
Companions of the Distinguished Service Order
Companions of the Order of the Bath
Graduates of the Royal Military College, Sandhurst
Indian Army personnel of World War II
People educated at Brighton College
Royal Inniskilling Fusiliers officers